The following is a list of the 104 municipalities (comuni) of the Province of Chieti, Abruzzo, Italy.

List

See also
List of municipalities of Italy

References

Chieti